The Cognitive Neuroscience Society (CNS) is an international academic society interested in multi-disciplinary approaches to cognitive brain function. Drawing primarily from the biological and psychological sciences, society members are involved in cognitive neuroscience research that attempts to integrate our understanding of the brain and mind.

Research into the functioning of the human brain, particularly during the past decade, has greatly enhanced our understanding of cognitive behaviors which are fundamental to education: learning, memory, intelligence, and emotion.

References

External links
Cognitive Neuroscience Society Homepage
A geographical history of social cognitive neuroscience
Chapter 7: Learning and Memory
NEUROSCIENCE AND PSYCHOLOGY: A HAPPY COUPLE?
Social cognitive neuroscience: a review of core processes

Psychology organizations
Health care-related professional associations based in the United States
Neuroscience organizations